George Barry Lupino-Hook (7 January 1884 – 26 September 1962)  was an English comedian and film actor, and a notable Pantomime dame.

He was the brother of the actor and comedian Stanley Lupino, the father of the actress Antoinette Lupino, and the uncle of the actresses Ida and Rita Lupino.

Lupino was married three times, to Gertrude Letchford, Mary Georgina Gordon Anstruther and Doriel M. Phillips.

Selected filmography
 Barry Butts In (1919)
 Never Trouble Trouble (1931)
 Master and Man (1934)
 Sporting Love (1936)
 Bed and Breakfast (1938)
 The Sky's the Limit (1938)
 Garrison Follies (1940)

See also
 Lupino family

References

External links
 

1884 births
1962 deaths
English male film actors
English male comedians
Male actors from London
20th-century English male actors
20th-century English comedians